The Georgia State Panthers baseball team represents Georgia State University in NCAA Division I college baseball. The  team currently competes in the Sun Belt Conference. It first began competing there before moving to the TAAC, and the CAA. Beginning July 1, 2013, Georgia State returned to the Sun Belt Conference for all sports. The Panthers play their home games at Georgia State's Panthersville sports complex in the GSU Baseball Complex.

History
The Georgia State Panthers baseball team first began playing in 1956 led by head coach Herbert "Stony" Burgess. The team would begin competition in the newly formed Sun Belt Conference in 1979 before moving to the Trans American Athletic Conference (TAAC) in 1984. The team joined the CAA in 2006. In 2014, the Panthers moved back to the Sun Belt Conference.

In its history, the team has been conference champions during the 1996 and 1998 season. Only during the 2009 season did the team win the conference tournament giving them an automatic berth into the 2009 NCAA Division I baseball tournament.

The program has produced one major league player. David Buchanan, a right-handed pitcher who played for the Panthers in 2010, made his major league debut on May 24, 2014. Buchanan made 35 starts on the mound for the Phillies over the 2014 and 2015 seasons.

On June 26, 2019, Brad Stromdahl was named the head coach of the program.

Stadium
The Panthers play in the 1,092-seat GSU Baseball Complex located in Panthersville, GA, several miles from the main Georgia State campus. The left field measures 334 feet, the center field measures 385, while right field measures 338 feet. The outfield wall, which was installed prior to the 1998 season, came from the original home of the Atlanta Braves, Fulton County Stadium.

In January 2021, it was revealed Georgia State plans on building a new 2,500 baseball stadium on the site of former Fulton County Stadium. Construction dates have not yet been announced.

Head coaches
The Panthers have had 10 head coaches in the history of their baseball program:

Notable players

David Buchanan was the first former Panther to play for a Major League Baseball franchise.  He was a pitcher for the Philadelphia Phillies (2014–15).
Hunter Gaddis was drafted in the fifth round of the 2019 Major League Baseball First-Year Player Draft by the Cleveland Guardians, making him the highest draft pick in school history, surpassing the 2010 seventh-round selection of David Buchanan by the Philadelphia Phillies.

Baseball seasons

See also
List of NCAA Division I baseball programs

References

External links